The Department of Economic Development and Competitiveness is the department of the Basque Government responsible for the community's economic development, including industry, energy, international trade, tourism, agriculture and fisheries. The department was created in 2012 as part of a reorganisation of government departments.

Ministers 
 1936-1947: Santiago Aznar
 1947-1952: Fermin Zarza
 1978-1980: Mikel Isasi
 1980-1983: Javier Garcia
 1983-1985: Juan Carlos Isasti
 1985-1987: Jose Ignacio Arrieta
 1987-1991: Ricardo Gonzalez
 1991-1995: Jon Imanol Azua
 1995-1999: Javier Retegi
 1999-2001: Josu Jon Imaz
 2001-2009: Ana Agirre
 2009-2012: Bernabe Unda
 2012-present Arantza Tapia

External links 
  

Basque Government
Basque Country
Basque Country